The Legislative Yuan is the unicameral legislature of the Republic of China (Taiwan), currently with 113 seats, down from the previous 225 in 1998. 

73 are directly elected in local single-member districts by the citizens residing in the free area of the Republic of China. 6 seats are elected by indigenous peoples voters in two three-member constituencies. 34 are elected on nationwide party-list.

Map

List of single-member constituencies

Historical constituencies

1948

Prior to the Kuomintang's defeat in Mainland China to the Chinese Communist Party in 1949, there were 759 seats in the Legislative Yuan.

Provinces
Andong (Antung): 5 seats
Anhui (Anhwei): 25 seats 
Chahar: 5 seats
Fujian (Fukien): 14 seats
Gansu (Kansu): 8 seats
Guangdong (Kwangtung): 33 seats
Guangxi (Kwanghsi): 16 seats
Guizhou (Kweichow): 12 seats
Hebei (Hopeh): 31 seats
Heilongjiang (Heilongkiang): 5 seats
Hejiang (Hojiang): 5 seats
Henan (Honan): 36 seats
Hubei (Hupeh): 28 seats 
Hunan: 33 seats
Jiangsu (Kiangsu): 38 seats
Jiangxi (Kiangsi): 22 seats
Jilin (Kirin): 9 seats
Liaobei (Liaopei):  5 seats 
Liaoning: 13 seats
Ningxia (Ninghsia): 5 seats
Nenjiang (Nunkiang): 5 seats
Qinghai (Tsinghai): 5 seats
Rehe (Jehol): 8 seats
Shaanxi (Shensi): 13 seats
Shandong (Shantung): 40 seats
Shanxi (Shansi): 16 seats 
Sichuan (Szechuan): 53 seats
Sonjiang (Sunkiang): 6 seats
Suiyuan: 5 seats
Taiwan: 8 seats
Xikang (Hsikang): 5 seats
Xing'an (Hsingan): 5 seats
Xinjiang (Sinkiang): 6 (5) seats
Yunnan: 14 seats
Zhejiang (Chekiang): 23 seats

Directly-controlled municipalities
Beiping (Peiping): 5 seats 
Chongqing (Chungking): 5 seats
Dalian (Dairen): 5 seats – (Soviet-controlled to 1950)
Guangzhou (Canton): 5 seats
Hankou (Hankow): 5 seats 
Harbin: 5 seats
Nanjing (Nanking): 5 seats – National capital
Qingdao (Tsingtao): 5 seats 
Shanghai: 7 seats
Shenyang (Mukden): 5 seats
Tianjin (Tiensin): 5 seats 
Xi'an (Sian): 5 seats

Outer Mongolia
Outer Mongolia: 22 seats

Tibet
Tibet (Xizang): 5 (3) seats
Overseas Tibetans: 5 seats
Provincial Tibetans: 5 seats

Ethnic minority representatives
Minorities in frontier regions: 6 seats
Overseas diaspora: 19 (8) seats

Economic and social representatives
Accounting: 1 seat
Agriculture: 18 seats
Business: 10 seats
Education: 10 seats
Engineering: 2 seats 
Fishery: 3 seats
Healthcare: 4 seats
Industrial and Mining: 10 seats
Journalism: 5 seats
Legal: 3 seats
Post-secondary Education: 5 seats
Workers: 18 seats

1992
Starting from the 1992 legislative election, the second Legislative Yuan had 161 members elected from the Taiwan Area of the Republic of China, 119 from 27 multi-member constituencies, 6 from indigenous constituencies, 6 from overseas constituencies and 30 elected on nationwide party-list.

1995
In 1995, the number of seats from the multi-member constituencies was increased to 122.

1998
In 1998, the number of seats was further increased to 225, 168 from 29 multi-member constituencies, 8 from indigenous constituencies, 8 from overseas constituencies and 41 elected on nationwide party-list.

See also 
 Legislative Yuan
 Legislative elections in Taiwan

Notes

References 

Constituencies in Taiwan
Lists of constituencies
Taiwan politics-related lists